Christmas in Stereo is a 1997 Christmas album featuring various indie rock bands. Each band had only two weeks to write their song.

A follow-up compilation, Christmas Two, was released in 1999.

Track listing
Autumn Teen Sound - Christmas Wish  – 2:36
My First Keyboard - Christmas Is Only Good If You Are a Girl (Boy)  – 2:02
The Catskills - Christmas (Baby Please Come Home)  – 2:35
Glacier Park - Candy, Toys, And Snow  – 1:55
Kincaid - White Christmas  – 2:54
Of Montreal - My Favorite Christmas (In a Hundred Words or Less)  – 2:55
Sky Mic- Pierced by a Stranger's Heart  – 4:50
Mendoza Line - Mairie d'Ivry  – 2:24
Aden - Silent Night  – 1:59
Teacups - Heritage Heights  – 4:23
Gritty Kitty - Why They Chose the North Pole  – 3:22
Bunnygrunt - I Am Gonna Be Warm This Winter  – 2:03
Masters of the Hemisphere - The First Noel  – 2:25
The Starroom Boys - (That's How I Know) It's Christmas Time  – 3:29
The Snowsuit Sound - Merry Christmas, Baby  – 2:52
Summer Hymns - Santa Couldn't Fit You Under My Christmas Tree  – 2:57
Major Organ and the Adding Machine - What a Wonderful World  – 2:06
The Marble Index - The Calendar Year  – 2:45
The Olivia Tremor Control - Christmas With William S.  – 2:53
Kindercore Records - Merry Christmas In Stereo  – 1:14

1997 Christmas albums
1997 compilation albums
Indie rock compilation albums